Henry Marshall (January 25, 1847 – September 24, 1938) was an American lawyer and politician from New York.

Life
He was born on January 25, 1847, in Washington County, New York, the son of Robert Marshall and Margaret (Law) Marshall. He attended the common schools and Cambridge Washington Academy. Then he entered politics, was a civil justice, and wrote editorials for the Seneca Falls Courier, and the Saratoga Daily Journal. He graduated from Albany Law School in 1882, was admitted to the bar, and practiced in New York City, but resided in Brooklyn.

Marshall was a member of the New York State Assembly (Kings Co., 17th D.) in 1896, 1897 and 1898.

He was a member of the New York State Senate (8th D.) from 1899 to 1904, sitting in the 122nd, 123rd, 124th, 125th, 126th and 127th New York State Legislatures.

He died on September 24, 1938, in Mary McClellan Hospital in Cambridge, New York, after an illness of two months.

Financier George Law (1806–1881) was his uncle.

Sources
 The New York Red Book compiled by Edgar L. Murlin (published by James B. Lyon, Albany NY, 1897; pg. 236 and 512f)
 HENRY MARSHALL; Ex-State Senator and Retired Lawyer of This City in NYT on September 26, 1938 (subscription required)

1847 births
1938 deaths
Republican Party New York (state) state senators
People from Cambridge, New York
Republican Party members of the New York State Assembly
Politicians from Brooklyn
Albany Law School alumni